Videle is a town in Teleorman County, Muntenia, Romania, with a population of 11,508 in 2011. It was upgraded to town status in 1968 by incorporation of a few villages nearby. Today, Coșoaia is the single associated village the town administers.

Geography
The town is situated on the Wallachian Plain, on the banks of the river Glavacioc and its left tributary, the Milcovăț. It lies in the northeastern part of Teleorman County, on the border with Giurgiu County.

Transportation
It is crossed by county roads DJ503 and DJ601.

The town is of some importance as a railway junction, for the railway track heading south to Giurgiu and Bulgaria leaves the main Wallachian East-West-railway from Bucharest to Craiova.

Economy
The Videle oil field is located on the administrative territory of the town.

Natives
 Valentin Costache (b. 1998), footballer
 Răzvan Ducan (b. 2001), footballer

References

Towns in Romania
Populated places in Teleorman County
Localities in Muntenia